Rockcliffe is a small, coastal village in Kirkcudbrightshire, Dumfries and Galloway in Scotland, with a view of Rough Island, Hestan Island, the Solway Firth and sometimes the Cumbrian coast.

Rockcliffe lies on the eastern side of the River Urr estuary, and gives access to Rough Island by way of both firm mud exposed at low tide and a natural, tidal causeway.

Road access is from Dalbeattie and Dumfries; although Kippford is nearby there is no direct road route.

Rockcliffe is also linked to Castle Point (site of a Roman fort), Glenstocken, Portling and Sandyhills by footpath.

The village is a combination of both residential and holiday let properties. Local business in Rockcliffe is mainly holiday lets, though the village also has one tea room, a caravan site and the surrounding farming industry. Salmon fishing with nets at Rough Island and cockle fishing are both occasionally based from the beach.

The village has a car park and a public toilet, now including a defibrillator, but no other facilities to speak of. An ice cream van can usually be relied upon to be open for business in the bay on even the cloudiest days.

The site of the 5th century Dark Ages hill fort called the Mote of Mark adjoins Rockcliffe. Furthermore this site is an example of a vitrified fort.

Baron's Craig, is a Victorian country house designed by Alfred Waterhouse in 1879. It was in use for much of the 20th century as an hotel and known as  the Baron's Craig Hotel.   Hotel extensions were added by architects Sutherland, Dickie and Copland in the early 1970s. The Rockliffe Gallery occupies part of the building and organises a series of annual exhibitions. 

Parts of Rockcliffe, in particular much of the land immediately to the north, are owned by the National Trust for Scotland.

References

External links 
 http://www.scottisharchitects.org.uk/building_full.php?id=413336

Rockcliffe in the 'Gazetteer for Scotland'
Rockcliffe at the National Trust for Scotland
http://www.doorsopendays.org.uk/places/dumfries-galloway/barons-craig-hotel-and-rockcliffe-gallery/
http://www.scottisharchitects.org.uk/architect_full.php?id=400170

Villages in Dumfries and Galloway